Scorpio Rising may refer to:

Music
Scorpio Rising (band), an English rock band
Scorpio Rising (Death in Vegas album), plus the title song
Scorpio Rising (Prong album)
Scorpio Rising, a 1976 album by Paul Ryan
Scorpio Rising, a 2002 album by Tomoyasu Hotei
"Scorpio Rising", a song by Adam Ant from his 1985 album Vive Le Rock
"Scorpio Rising", a song by the Filipino rock band Eraserheads from their 1998 international album Aloha Milkyway
"Scorpio Rising", a track by Yello from the December 2009 re-release of their album Touch Yello
"Scorpio Rising", a song by 10,000 Maniacs from their 1985 album The Wishing Chair

Other uses
Scorpio Rising (film), a 1963 short film by Kenneth Anger
"Scorpio Rising" (Mighty Max episode), the 38th Mighty Max cartoon episode

See also
 Scorpia Rising, a novel in the Alex Rider series by Anthony Horowitz